The Flemington Maintenance Depot is the largest Sydney Trains depot, located in the western Sydney suburb of Lidcombe, but named after Flemington further east.

The depot opened in 1927 and was one of four electric train depots built under the Bradfield electrification plan, the other depots being at Mortdale, Hornsby and Punchbowl. The depot features 20 storage roads, 10 of which are under the main shed, a lift shop, wheel lathe and a train washing facility. The depot has rail connections to all tracks of the Main Suburban Line, as well as the Sydney Freight Network. Road access for deliveries is off Bachell Avenue, Lidcombe. A staff-only stuttle bus, operated by CDC, operates between the depot and Lidcombe station.

The depot maintains the K sets and NSW TrainLink's V sets. It was also responsible for the S sets and C sets before they were withdrawn. Sets maintained by Flemington carry a blue target plate. A variety of other trains are also stabled here, as it is a crew depot and stabling location for Sector 2 (T2/3/5/7 lines) services. NSW TrainLink Endeavours and XPTs occasionally visit to use the wheel lathe.

Until May 1968, it was responsible for maintaining the long-distance HUB, RUB and stainless steel carriages. Until March 1971, it also maintained the DEB sets. All were transferred to ACDEP.

Maps

{
"type": "ExternalData",
"service": "geomask",
"ids": "Q5458626"
}
[{
"type": "ExternalData",
"service": "page",
"title": "Sydney Trains network.map"
},
{
"type": "ExternalData",
"service": "page",
"title": "Sydney suburban rail maintenance centres.map"
}]

References 

Industrial buildings in Sydney
Railway workshops in New South Wales
Sydney Trains
1927 establishments in Australia
Municipality of Strathfield